Amanda Goodman, also known by her former stage name Mandy Bonhomme, is an American voice and television actress who has worked on the properties of Central Park Media, Media Blasters and The Right Stuf International. Goodman studied acting in New York and is best known for voicing Juri Arisugawa and Keiko Sonoda in Revolutionary Girl Utena, as well as Komaki Asagiri in Genshiken and its spinoff Kujibiki Unbalance. She also lends her voice to video games and audiobooks. Non-anime work includes Running Man on Cartoon Network, Pup 2 No Good, The Star Maker, and the Shadowy Woman in the Nicktoons series Speed Racer: The Next Generation and Amber, one of the Solid Gold Elite Dancers in the machinima This Spartan Life. Goodman currently resides in New York City.

Filmography

Voice roles
 The Star Maker - Mom 
 Pup 2 No Good - Victoria, Farmer's Wife
 Adolescence of Utena - Juri Arisugawa
Assemble Insert - Kagairi Sonoba, Hostess
Ayane's High Kick - Kimiyo Tasaka, Ayane's Mom
Boogiepop Phantom - Atsuko Abe, Rie Takai, Girl
Comic Party - Asahi, Multi, Shiho
Gall Force 2 - Destruction - Adrienne
Garzey's Wing - Leelince
Genshiken - Komaki Asagiri (Kujibiki)
Gokudo - Additional Voices
Gravitation - Additional Voices
Jewel BEM Hunter Lime - Mizuki Seo
Kare Kano - Yurika
Knights of Ramune - Tequila
Kujibiki Unbalance - Komaki Asagiri
Ping Pong Club - Tachibana, Additional Voices
Pokémon - Sue, Additional Voices 
Revolutionary Girl Utena - Juri Arisugawa, Keiko Sonoda, Shadow Girl A, Teacher
Sins of the Sisters - Kumi
Slayers NEXT - Mimi, Nene
Speed Racer: The Next Generation - Shadowy Woman (Season 1)
The World of Narue - Yuki Kashiwazaki
This Spartan Life - Amber, Solid Gold Elite Dancers

Live-action roles
 Law & Order - Dana Flynn
 Red Butterfly - Lounge Hipster
 Westward Expansion - Abigail
 Yellow Brick Hell - Acting Student

References

External links
Official Site

Living people
Actresses from New York City
American television actresses
American voice actresses
Year of birth missing (living people)
20th-century American actresses
21st-century American actresses